Cornettsville may refer to a place in the United States:

Cornettsville, Indiana
Cornettsville, Kentucky